Bubbling Under the Top LPs was a weekly record chart published in the United States by Billboard magazine in the 1970s and 1980s. A corollary to the Bubbling Under the Hot 100 singles chart, this chart listed albums that had not yet charted on the magazine's main album chart, Top LPs & Tape.

The chart first appeared in the 26 December 1970 issue of the magazine. Its first iteration was an unnumbered list, but numbering began in the 13 March 1971 issue. The chart ranged from four to 35 entries, until settling at ten entries from 6 July 1974 on.  Beginning with the issue of 20 October 1984, the chart was renamed Bubbling Under the Top 200 Albums to matching a title change of the main album chart.  It was renamed again—Bubbling Under the Top Pop Albums—beginning in the 9 February 1985 issue once again reflecting a change of the main album chart's name. For the life of the chart, it was paired with Bubbling Under the Hot 100.

The chart ceased to exist after its final appearance in the 24 August 1985 issue, the same date that saw a discontinuation of the Bubbling Under Hot 100. While the Bubbling Under Hot 100 was revived in 1992, Billboard has never published another Bubbling Under albums chart.

Notes

References

Billboard charts